The men's downhill is an event at the annual UCI Mountain Bike & Trails World Championships. It has been held since the inaugural championships in 1990.

Medalists

Medal table

Medal table by rider

References
Results from the Union Cycliste Internationale's website.

Events at the UCI Mountain Bike & Trials World Championships